The Training Facility at Nova Southeastern University, formerly the Miami Dolphins Training Facility, is located on the Nova Southeastern University main campus in Davie, Florida. It is the former headquarters location for the Miami Dolphins, as well as a location for frequent special events.

Architecture and features

Bowing trusses and a profile reminiscent of classic athletic facilities define this state of the art training facility. It includes a large weight room, training rooms, locker rooms, a therapy swimming pool, a cold plunge pool and whirlpools, numerous administrative offices, and a practice field. It also has a bleacher building, which can accommodate 2,000 spectators. The  facility is frequently used as a prototype for professional football teams.
There is also an indoor training field known as "The Bubble." The “bubble” is an air-supported structure manufactured and installed by Air Structures American Technologies Incorporated (ASATI) and constructed by Stiles Construction, the same corporation who worked on the expansion of Dolphin Stadium for Super Bowl XLI. The football field, installed by The Motz Group, is regulation size and made of synthetic turf consisting of 75% rubber and 25% sand to provide a firm-playing surface. Loud crowd noise can also be replicated in the bubble.

History
The Dolphins trained at Saint Andrew's School in the late 1960s and St. Thomas University from July 12, 1970 until June 4, 1993. The ribbon cutting ceremony for the new training facility was July 11, 1993. The Dolphins left the Nova Southeastern University training facility in June 2021.

The Bubble

September 26, 2006 the Dolphins made their first significant expansion to the facility since it first opened with the opening of an air supported air conditioned indoor training field. The current owner of the Bubble is Jamaican born Jerome Harriott, who leases it to the Dolphins. In 2018 Hellas Construction installed its Matrix Turf with Helix Technology along with organic infill made of coconut and cork fibers. The Dolphins are the first team to have organic infill.

“We’re proud to become the first professional football team in Florida to have such a venue. We believe it will help the team from a competitive standpoint as it will allow for closer game simulation during practice and allow the team to continue practicing even when storms roll in,” Bryan Wiedmeier, president of the Miami Dolphins, said.

The fabric used is extremely light, yet strong. Inflation is maintained via fans in the HVAC units through the integrated control system.

The structure was designed to withstand hurricane force winds up to category three. Internal air pressure is increased to "stiffen" the structure to withstand wind loading.

The bubble is used by the NSU University School Sharks for practice and scrimmages.

The Bubble was designed by its current owner and angel investor, Jerome Harriott. Harriott leases the facility to the organization.

New Training Facility in Miami Gardens

The Dolphins announced plans to move its training facility from Davie to a new facility to be called Baptist Health Training Complex that will be located on the northwest side of Hard Rock Stadium in Miami Gardens, Florida. The move would bring Dolphins owner Stephen Ross’s total investment in his stadium property to more than $600 million since 2015. Ross has spent a half-billion dollars on renovating Hard Rock Stadium, and funded the construction to host the Miami Open which began in 2019. The Miami Dolphins broke ground Tuesday August 20, 2019 on a $135 million state-of-the-art training complex and sports performance clinic next to Hard Rock Stadium. The new complex, which has 125,000 square feet, was completed in 2021.

Super Bowl
The 2006 AFC Champion Indianapolis Colts used the facility while preparing for Super Bowl XLI.  The other team, the NFC Champion Chicago Bears, used the Miami Hurricanes Football Facility at the University of Miami.

The Kansas City Chiefs used the facility while preparing for Super Bowl LIV.  The other team, the San Francisco 49ers, used the Miami Hurricanes Football Facility at the University of Miami.

References

Nova Southeastern University
Miami Dolphins
Davie, Florida
Buildings and structures in Broward County, Florida
1993 establishments in Florida
Sports venues completed in 1993